The Kalverdijkje is an indoor sports complex in Leeuwarden, Netherlands. The complex has a swimming pool, and hosts basketball, volleyball and korfball matches. It is the home arena of professional basketball club Aris Leeuwarden of the Dutch Basketball League.

The Kalverdijkje has two halls, the Egelantierhal and the Schieringenhal; the latter is used most. Aris Leeuwarden plays its home games in this hall, which has a capacity of 1,700 people. Before its expansion in 2014, it had a capacity of 1,000 people.

On 29 September 2017, the Donar basketball team from played one Basketball Champions League qualifying game in the Kalverdijkje against CB Estudiantes.

Sporting events

References

Basketball venues in the Netherlands
Sports venues in Friesland
Sport in Leeuwarden
Buildings and structures in Leeuwarden